Morocco participated at the 2018 Summer Youth Olympics in Buenos Aires, Argentina from 6 October to 18 October 2018.

Medals

Medals awarded to participants of mixed-NOC (combined) teams are represented in italics. These medals are not counted towards the individual NOC medal tally.

Athletics

Boys
Track and road events

Girls
Track and road events

Boxing

Boys

Girls

Judo

Individual

Team

Karate

Morocco qualified two athletes based on its performance at one of the Karate Qualification Tournaments.

 Boys' 61 kg - Oussama Edari
 Boys' -68 kg - Yassine Sekouri
 Boys' +68 kg - Nabil Ech-Chaabi

Sailing

Morocco qualified one boat based on its performance at the African and European IKA Twin Tip Racing Qualifiers.

 Boys' IKA Twin Tip Racing - 1 boat

Swimming

Taekwondo

Morocco qualified two athletes during the WORLD TAEKWONDO QUALIFICATION TOURNAMENT FOR BUENOS AIRES 2018 YOUTH OLYMPIC GAMES.

 Girls' -55 kg - Safia Salih
 Girls' +63 kg - Fatima-Ezzahra Aboufaras

Wrestling

Morocco qualified one wrestler based on its performance at the 2018 African Cadet Championships. 

Key:
  – Victory by Fall
  – Without any points scored by the opponent
  – With point(s) scored by the opponent
  – Without any points scored by the opponent
  – With point(s) scored by the opponent

References

2018 in Moroccan sport
Nations at the 2018 Summer Youth Olympics
Morocco at the Youth Olympics